Malika El Aroud (aka Umm Obeyda; born 1960) is a Moroccan terror activist with ties to al-Qaeda known for her writings on the Internet.

Her first husband, Dahmane Abd al-Sattar, a.k.a. Abdessatar Dahmane is one of the men who killed Mujahedin resistance leader Ahmad Shah Massoud two days before the September 11, 2001 attacks. In 2003 she was one of 22 people tried in Belgium for complicity in Massoud's murder, but there was insufficient evidence to convict her. In June 2007 she and her second husband Moez Garsalloui were found guilty by a Swiss court of supporting radical organizations via internet sites.

El Aroud has been called a danger by a European terrorism expert because her high-profile advocacy has made her a role model and a source of inspiration to female jihadists.

Biography
The New York Times says she is a prominent advocate of jihad on the Internet, and has called herself a female holy warrior for Al Qaeda. She is the widow of Dahmane Abd al-Sattar, a.k.a. Abdessatar Dahmane, one of the men who killed anti-Taliban leader Ahmad Shah Massoud two days before the September 11, 2001 attacks. According to CNN, she admitted in 2008 that she was devoted to Osama bin Laden.

In February 2005 she was detained along with her Tunisian-born second husband Moez Garsalloui in an anti-terror raid.  She was accused of operating a jihadist website which incited others to criminal acts and racial violence. While living in Switzerland (near Fribourg), she and her husband were charged with setting up websites to promote racially motivated crimes. The New York Times reports that, as part of first Internet-related criminal case, she was tried and found guilty by a Swiss court in June 2007 of promoting violence and supporting a criminal organization, and was given a six-month suspended sentence.

According to journalists Elaine Sciolino and Souad Mekhennet, "writing in French under the name "Oum Obeyda", [El Aroud] has transformed herself into one of the most prominent Internet jihadists in Europe," by bullying "Muslim men to go and fight" and rallying "women to join the cause." In an interview she told the journalists: "I have a weapon. It’s to write. It’s to speak out. That’s my jihad. You can do many things with words. Writing is also a bomb."

She is quoted as telling Western audiences: "Vietnam is nothing compared to what awaits you on our lands ... Ask your mothers, your wives to order your coffins." And telling her followers: "Victory is appearing on the horizon my brothers and sisters. Let’s intensify our prayers."

On December 11, 2008, she was arrested by the Belgian police with a group of people suspected of terrorist links.

In February 2009, CNN presented an interview with El Aroud, as well as various people familiar with her activities or involved with her court proceedings, as part of CNN's regular program, "World's Untold Stories".

In May 2010, she was convicted in Brussels on terrorism charges and sentenced to eight years in prison.

In December 2017, she was stripped of her Belgian citizenship by the Court of Appeal in Brussels.

In February 2019, Belgian authorities decided to deport Al Aroud to Morroco.

References

People from Tangier
Al-Qaeda propagandists
Moroccan propagandists
Living people
Year of birth missing (living people)